This article contains information about the literary events and publications of 1992.

Events
July – The Goosebumps series of children's horror fiction, penned by R. L. Stine, is first published in the United States.
August – An attempt is made to set fire to the National Library of Abkhazia in Sukhumi during the War in Abkhazia by Georgian forces.
August 25 – The National and University Library of Bosnia and Herzegovina is annihilated during the Siege of Sarajevo by the Army of Republika Srpska.
September – Michael Ondaatje's historiographic metafiction The English Patient is published in Canada. It will win The Golden Man Booker in 2018.

New books

Fiction
Ben Aaronovitch – Transit
Tariq Ali – Shadows of the Pomegranate Tree
Paul Auster – Leviathan
Iain Banks – The Crow Road
Clive Barker – The Thief of Always
Julian Barnes – The Porcupine
Greg Bear – Anvil of Stars
Thomas Berger – Meeting Evil
Louis de Bernières – The Troublesome Offspring of Cardinal Guzman
James P. Blaylock – Lord Kelvin's Machine
Pascal Bruckner – The Divine Child
A. S. Byatt – Morpho Eugenia
Roger Caron – Dreamcaper
Andrew Cartmel – Cat's Cradle: Warhead
Patrick Chamoiseau – Texaco
Paulo Coelho – The Valkyries
Michael Connelly – The Black Echo
Hugh Cook
The Witchlord and the Weaponmaster
The Worshippers and the Way
Paul Cornell – Love and War
Bernard Cornwell
Sharpe's Devil
Scoundrel
Douglas Coupland – Shampoo Planet
Mia Couto – Sleepwalking Land (Terra Sonâmbula)
Robert Crais – Lullaby Town
L. Sprague de Camp and Christopher Stasheff – The Enchanter Reborn
Elena Ferrante – L'amore molesto (Troubling Love)
Tibor Fischer – Under the Frog
Leon Forrest – Divine Days
John Gardner – Death is Forever
Neil Gaiman – The Sandman: Season of Mists (graphic novel; volume 4 of The Sandman series)
Neil Gaiman and Dave McKean – Signal to Noise (graphic novel)
Cristina García – Dreaming in Cuban
Mark Gatiss – Nightshade
Ann Granger – Cold in the Earth
Alasdair Gray – Poor Things
John Grisham – The Pelican Brief
Hella Haasse – Heren van de thee (The Tea Lords)
Victor Headley – Yardie
Andrew Hunt – Cat's Cradle: Witch Mark
Simon Ings – Hot Head
P. D. James – The Children of Men
Denis Johnson – Jesus' Son (short story collection)
John Kessel – Meeting in Infinity
Stephen King
Dolores Claiborne
Gerald's Game
Patrick McCabe – The Butcher Boy
Cormac McCarthy – All the Pretty Horses (Book 1 of the Border Trilogy)
Val McDermid – Dead Beat
Ian McEwan – Black Dogs
Terry McMillan – Waiting to Exhale
Javier Marías – A Heart So White (Corazón tan blanco)
Andrés L. Mateo – La Balada de Alfonsina Bairán
Rohinton Mistry – Tales from Firozsha Baag
Caitlin Moran – The Chronicles of Narmo
Toni Morrison – Jazz
Michael Ondaatje – The English Patient
Ellis Peters – The Holy Thief
Marc Platt – Cat's Cradle: Time's Crucible
Terry Pratchett
Lords and Ladies
Small Gods
Anne Rice – The Tale of the Body Thief
Mordecai Richler – Oh Canada! Oh Quebec!
Jennifer Roberson – Lady of the Forest
Robert Schneider – Schlafes Bruder
Patricia Schonstein – A Time of Angels
W. G. Sebald – The Emigrants (Die Ausgewanderten: Vier lange Erzählungen)
Gail Sheehy – Silent Passage
Sidney Sheldon – The Stars Shine Down
Michael Slade – Cutthroat
Danielle Steel
Jewels
Mixed Blessings
Neal Stephenson – Snow Crash
Adam Thorpe – Ulverton
Sue Townsend – The Queen and I
Rose Tremain – Sacred Country
Barry Unsworth – Sacred Hunger
John Updike – Memories of the Ford Administration
Gore Vidal – Live from Golgotha: The Gospel according to Gore Vidal
Vernor Vinge – A Fire Upon the Deep
Robert James Waller – The Bridges of Madison County
Connie Willis – Doomsday Book
Timothy Zahn – Dark Force Rising
Roger Zelazny and Thomas Thurston Thomas – Flare
Juan Eduardo Zúñiga
El último día del mundo (The last day of the world)
Misterios de las noches y los días (Mysteries of the nights and days; short stories)

Children and young people
Pamela Allen – Belinda
Chris Van Allsburg – The Widow's Broom
Gillian Cross – The Great Elephant Chase
Garry Disher – The Bamboo Flute
Anne Fine – Flour Babies
Jamila Gavin – The Wheel of Surya (first in the Surya trilogy)
Rumer Godden
Great Grandfather's House
Listen to the Nightingale
Virginia Hamilton (with Jerry Pinkney) – Drylongso
William Mayne – Low Tide
Gerald McDermott – Zomo The Rabbit: A Trickster Tale From West Africa
Hilary McKay – The Exiles
Michael Morpurgo – Waiting for Anya
Barry Moser – Polly Vaughn: A Traditional British Ballad
Jim Murphy – The Long Road to Gettysburg
Marcus Pfister – Rainbow Fish (Der Regenbogenfisch)
Gloria Jean Pinkney (with Jerry Pinkney) – Back Home
Marjorie W. Sharmat (with Marc Simont) – Nate the Great and the Stolen Base
Ulf Stark – Can You Whistle, Johanna? (Kan du vissla Johanna?)
Christopher Tolkien (with J. R. R. Tolkien and Alan Lee) – Sauron Defeated
Judith Vigna – Black Like Kyra White Like Me
Martin Waddell – Owl Babies
Nancy Willard (with Barry Moser) – Beauty and the Beast
Douglas Wood – Old Turtle
Susan Meddaugh – Martha Speaks

Drama
Herb Gardner – Conversations with My Father
Peter Handke – Die Stunde, da wir nichts voneinander wußten (The Hour We Knew Nothing Of Each Other)
David Mamet – Oleanna
Louis Nowra – Così
Zlatko Topčić – Musa And The Goat (radio version)
Michael Wall – Women Laughing
Peter Whelan – The School of Night

Poetry

Ben Okri – An African Elegy

Non-fiction
Nelson Algren (died 1981) – America Eats (travel book, written 1930s)
Karen Armstrong – Muhammad: A Biography of the Prophet
Bill Bryson – Neither Here Nor There: Travels in Europe
Linda Colley – Britons: Forging the Nation 1707–1837
Esther Delisle – The Traitor and the Jew (Le Traître et le Juif: Lionel Groulx, le Devoir et le délire du nationalisme d'extrême droite dans la province de Québec, 1929–1939)
Daniel Dennett – Consciousness Explained
Eamon Duffy – The Stripping of the Altars: Traditional Religion in England, c. 1400 to c. 1580
Gerina Dunwich – Secrets of Love Magick
Christiane Éluère – The Celts: First Masters of Europe
John Gray – Men Are from Mars, Women Are from Venus
Elizabeth Hay – The Only Snow in Havana
Nick Hornby – Fever Pitch
Charles Jennings - Up North
Neil Lyndon – No More Sex War: The Failures of Feminism
Andrew Morton – Diana: Her True Story
Mark E. Neely, Jr. – The Fate of Liberty: Abraham Lincoln and Civil Liberties
Liza Potvin – White Lies (for my mother)
Léon Werth (died 1955) – 33 Jours (written 1940)

Anthologies
Margaret Busby (ed.) – Daughters of Africa: An International Anthology of Words and Writings by Women of African Descent from the Ancient Egyptian to the Present

Births
March 4 - Gaurav Sharma, Indian author
April 14 - Naoise Dolan, Irish novelist
August 12 - Naoki Higashida, Japanese autistic author
September 18 - Jidanun Lueangpiansamut, Thai writer
October 5 - Rupi Kaur, Indian-born Canadian poet, illustrator, photographer, and author
October 30 - Édouard Louis, French writer
November 11 - Aya Mansour, Iraqi poet, writer, and journalist

Deaths
January 4 – Alejandro Carrión, Ecuadorian poet and journalist (born 1915)
January 9 – Bill Naughton, Irish-born English playwright and novelist (born 1910)
January 4 – John Sparrow, English literary scholar (born 1906)
January 14 – Irakli Abashidze, Georgian poet, literary scholar and politician (born 1909)
January 28 – Dora Birtles, Australian novelist, poet and children's writer (born 1903)
February 10 – Alex Haley, African-American writer (born 1921)
February 16
Angela Carter, English novelist (lung cancer, born 1940)
George MacBeth, Scottish poet and novelist (motor neurone disease, born 1932)
April 4 – Vintilă Horia, Romanian writer (born 1915)
April 6 – Isaac Asimov, American science fiction author (born 1920)
April 21 – Väinö Linna, Finnish novelist (born 1920)
April 28 – Iceberg Slim (Robert Beck), American novelist (born 1918)
May 22 – Elizabeth David, English cookery writer (born 1913)
July 6 – Mary Q. Steele, American novelist (born 1922)
July 22 – Reginald Bretnor, American science fiction writer (born 1911)
July 23 – Robert Liddell, English biographer, novelist and poet (born 1908)
August 4 – Seichō Matsumoto, Japanese mystery writer and journalist (born 1909)
August 29 – Mary Norton, English children's writer (born 1903)
September 5 – Fritz Leiber, American writer of fantasy and science fiction (born 1910)
November 7 – Richard Yates, American novelist and short-story writer (emphysema, born 1926)
November 17 – Audre Lorde, American poet, writer and feminist (born 1934)
December 22 – Ted Willis, English TV dramatist (born 1914)
December 25 – Monica Dickens, English novelist (born 1915)
December 27 – Kay Boyle, American writer, educator and activist (born 1902)

Awards
Nobel Prize for Literature: Derek Walcott
Camões Prize: Vergílio Ferreira

Australia
The Australian/Vogel Literary Award: Fotini Epanomitis, The Mule's Foal
C. J. Dennis Prize for Poetry: Robert Harris, Jane, Interlinear and Other Poems
Kenneth Slessor Prize for Poetry: Elizabeth Riddell, Selected Poems
Mary Gilmore Prize: Alison Croggon, This is the Stone
Miles Franklin Award: Tim Winton, Cloudstreet

Canada
See 1992 Governor General's Awards for a complete list of winners and finalists for those awards.
Edna Staebler Award for Creative Non-Fiction: Marie Wadden, Nitassinan: The Innu Struggle to Reclaim Their Homeland

France
Prix Goncourt: Patrick Chamoiseau, Texaco
Prix Décembre: Henri Thomas, La Chasse au trésor and Roger Grenier, Regardez la neige qui tombe
Prix Médicis French: Michel Rio, Tlacuilo
Prix Médicis International: Louis Begley, Une éducation polonaise

United Kingdom
Booker Prize: Michael Ondaatje, The English Patient and Barry Unsworth, Sacred Hunger
Carnegie Medal for children's literature: Anne Fine, Flour Babies
James Tait Black Memorial Prize for fiction: Rose Tremain, Sacred Country
James Tait Black Memorial Prize for biography: Charles Nicholl, The Reckoning: The Murder of Christopher Marlowe
Cholmondeley Award: Allen Curnow, Donald Davie, Carol Ann Duffy, Roger Woddis
Eric Gregory Award: Jill Dawson, Hugh Dunkerley, Christopher Greenhalgh, Marita Maddah, Stuart Paterson, Stuart Pickford
Queen's Gold Medal for Poetry: Kathleen Raine
Whitbread Best Book Award: Jeff Torrington, Swing Hammer Swing!
The Sunday Express Book of the Year: Hilary Mantel, A Place of Greater Safety
Forward Prizes for Poetry (first awards): Thom Gunn, The Man with Night Sweats (collection); Simon Armitage, Kid (first collection); Jackie Kay, "Black Bottom" (single poem)

United States
Agnes Lynch Starrett Poetry Prize: Hunt Hawkins, The Domestic Life
Aiken Taylor Award for Modern American Poetry: Gwendolyn Brooks
American Academy of Arts and Letters Gold Medal for Drama: Sam Shepard
Bobbitt National Prize for Poetry: Louise Glück for Ararat, and Mark Strand for The Continuous Life
Compton Crook Award: Carol Severance, Reefsong
Frost Medal: Adrienne Rich / David Ignatow
National Book Award for Fiction: to All the Pretty Horses by Cormac McCarthy
National Book Critics Circle Award: to Young Men and Fire by Norman Maclean
Nebula Award: Connie Willis, Doomsday Book
Newbery Medal for children's literature: Phyllis Reynolds Naylor, Shiloh
PEN/Faulkner Award for Fiction: to Mao II by Don DeLillo
Pulitzer Prize for Fiction: Jane Smiley, A Thousand Acres
Pulitzer Prize for Poetry: James Tate, Selected Poems
Pulitzer Prize for Drama: Robert Schenkkan, The Kentucky Cycle
Whiting Awards:
Fiction: R.S. Jones, J.S. Marcus, Damien Wilkins
Nonfiction: Eva Hoffman, Katha Pollitt (poetry/nonfiction)
Plays: Suzan-Lori Parks, Keith Reddin, José Rivera
Poetry: Roger Fanning, Jane Mead

Elsewhere
Premio Nadal: Alejandro Gándara, Ciegas esperanzas

References

 
Years of the 20th century in literature